Glaucocharis margretella is a moth in the family Crambidae. It was described by David E. Gaskin in 1985. It is found in Indonesia, where it has been recorded from the Riau Archipelago.

References

Diptychophorini
Moths described in 1985